Enrique Sánchez Lansch (born 1963) is a Spanish-German film director and screenwriter.

History
Enrique Sánchez Lansch was born in Gijón, Northern Spain to a Spanish father and German mother. He was raised in Gijón and Cologne, Germany. During his extensive academic and artistic education in theatre and music (including a career as an opera singer as well as a master's degree in Romance Philology, writing his master’s thesis on film adaptation of literature) Enrique Sánchez Lansch worked as an assistant director first for opera productions and later for film and TV while still performing on the opera stage. In the mid 1990s he decided to focus exclusively on film. His work brought him beyond Germany to Italy, France and Greece, writing and directing films mostly on the subjects of music, opera and ballet.

After some years of producing and directing fiction programs for television, Enrique Sánchez Lansch spent a year developing new projects and improving his film and screenwriting skills at Columbia University in New York, and at the University of California at Los Angeles (UCLA). Since 2002 he has been based in Berlin, working as a director and writer of feature length films, both documentary and fiction.

Filmography

 Russian Salon Music - Scriabin and Rachmaninoff. TV-Production in the studios of WDR-Cologne, Germany (Producer: José Montes-Baquer). Documentary and virtuoso piano works played by Burkard Schliessmann. 30 min, 1995
 Rhythm Is It! - Cinema documentary co-directed by Thomas Grube on a dance project with schoolchildren on Stravinsky's Le sacre du printemps with choreographer Royston Maldoom, Sir Simon Rattle and the Berlin Philharmonic. 100 min, 2004
 Sing for your life! - Documentary about hopes and fears of young participants in the competition Neue Stimmen. 60 min, 2005
 Schumann, Schubert and the Snow film adaptation of the piano opera by Hans Neuenfels with art songs by Robert Schumann and Franz Schubert. 60 min. 2006.
 Art of the Fugue Musicfilm about Bach's Art of the Fugue with the Ensemble Musica Antiqua Köln, shot in the Langen Foundation, Neuss – Reinhard Goebel. 75 min. 2007.
 Mstislaw Rostropowitsch – The musical conscience Documentary about and with cellist and director Rostropowitsch with his last orchestral rehearsals and masterclasses. 52 min. 2007.
 Jetzt ist die Zeit schon um...  two-piece documentary about Rachmaninow and growing old. With Semyon Bychkov and the WDR Symphonyorchestra. 2× 60 min. 2007.
 “The Reichsorchester” - Documentary about the Berlin Philharmonic between 1933 and 1945. 90 min, 2007
 The Promise of music – Documentary about the young conductor Gustavo Dudamel and the Sinfónica de la Juventud Venezolana Simón Bolívar. 90 min, 2008
 Lass mich ewig komponieren. KLANG – the 24 hours of the day. Documentary about rehearsals and premiere of Stockhausens cycle KLANG. 60 min. 2010.
 Piano Encounters -  In different workshops young children meet world class pianists Emanuel Ax, Katia & Marielle Labéque, Gabriela Montero and the Duo Tal & Groethuysen. A film about the highs and lows of practicing the piano. 95 min, 2010
 Irgendwo auf der Welt Dagmar Manzel discovers Werner Richard Heymann. Documentary. 59min. 2011
 SUNDAY from LIGHT - The premiere of Karl-Heinz Stockhausen's opera. Documentary. 59min. 2011
 The 12 - The 12 Cellists of the Berlin Philharmonic. Documentary. 59 min. 2012
 Overture 1912 - 100 Years Deutsche Oper Berlin. Documentary. 90 min. 2012.
 Sound of the Ruhr - 25 Years Ruhr Piano Festival. Documentary. 59 min. 2013

Awards
The theatrical documentary Rhythm is it! was awarded with the German Critics Award, the Bavarian Film Award and twice with the German Film Award.

The Promise of Music received the Best Music Documentary Award at the Los Angeles Latino International Film Festival.

The Reichsorchester was awarded the Diapason D'Or De L'Année 2008, and the Choc du Monde de La Musique De L'Année 2008.

Piano Encounters won the second prize for best documentary 2010 at the SEMINCI, the international film festival in Valladolid, Spain.

External links
 http://www.rhythmisit.com
 Schumann, Schubert und der Schnee
 Kunst der Fuge
 https://web.archive.org/web/20110715171545/http://www.reichsorchester-film.com/
 https://web.archive.org/web/20110128195829/http://promiseofmusic.com/
 

Film people from Cologne
Mass media people from North Rhine-Westphalia
German expatriates in Spain
1963 births
Living people
People from Asturias
People from Gijón